Jennifer Batu Bawsita (born 24 October 1993 at Montereau Fault Yonne), is a Franco-Congolese athlete, who specializes in the hammer throw.

Biography  
She began athletics in 2004 and competed for the club Us Nemours Saint Pierre athletics until 2011, then she was transferred to the club, l'Entente Franconville Césame Val d'Oise.  In 2015, she finished third  at the Africa Games at Brazzaville. With a hurl of  62.13m.  She improved her own record and that of the Congo.

International competitions

Notes and references

External links  
FFA profile

1993 births
Living people
People from Montereau-Fault-Yonne
French sportspeople of Republic of the Congo descent
Republic of the Congo female athletes
French female hammer throwers
Athletes (track and field) at the 2015 African Games
African Games bronze medalists for the Republic of the Congo
African Games medalists in athletics (track and field)
Sportspeople from Seine-et-Marne
Athletes (track and field) at the 2019 African Games
Black French sportspeople